Wesley Gassova Ribeiro Teixeira (born 5 March 2005), known as Wesley Gassova or just Wesley, is a Brazilian footballer who plays as a forward for Corinthians.

Club career
Born in São Paulo, Wesley joined Corinthians' youth setup in 2016, for the under-11 squad. On 12 April 2022, he signed his first professional contract with the club, after agreeing to a three-year deal.

Wesley made his first team debut on 20 April 2022, coming on as a second-half substitute for Gustavo Silva in a 1–1 away draw against Portuguesa-RJ, for the year's Copa do Brasil. His Série A debut occurred on 7 June, as he again replaced Gustavo in a 1–0 away loss against Cuiabá.

Personal life
Wesley's father Wladimir was also a footballer, who played for lower league teams in Portugal and Belgium.

Career statistics

References

2005 births
Living people
Footballers from São Paulo
Brazilian footballers
Association football forwards
Campeonato Brasileiro Série A players
Sport Club Corinthians Paulista players